The white-collared jay (Cyanolyca viridicyanus) is a species of bird in the family Corvidae. It is found in Andean forests in Peru and Bolivia. It was formerly considered conspecific with the black-collared jay. The white-collared jay has been classified as least concerned in 1988 and as a near threaten in 2012.

Description 
The White-collared jay has a long and slender tail without an crest white overall dark blue coloration. Black covers the face and throat with a thin white eyebrow and chest.

References

white-collared jay
Birds of the Bolivian Andes
Birds of the Peruvian Andes
white-collared jay
Taxonomy articles created by Polbot